Holoptygma is a genus of moths belonging to the family Tortricidae.

Species
Holoptygma braulio Razowski & Becker, 2011
Holoptygma lingunca Razowski & Wojtusiak, 2011
Holoptygma lurida (Meyrick, 1912)
Holoptygma sarahpelzae Razowski & Pelz, 2007

See also
List of Tortricidae genera

References

 , 2005: World catalogue of insects volume 5 Tortricidae.
 , 1986, Pan-Pacif. Ent. 62: 388.
 , 2011: Systematic and faunistic data on Neotropical Tortricidae: Phricanthini, Tortricini, Atteriini, Polyorthini, Chlidanotini (Lepidoptera: Tortricidae). Shilap Revista de Lepidopterologia 39 (154): 161–181.
 , 2011: Tortricidae (Lepidoptera) from Colombia). Acta Zoologica Cracoviensia 54B (1-2): 103–128. Full article: .

External links
tortricidae.com

Atteriini
Tortricidae genera